Hans Edgar Neugebauer (17 November 1916 in Karlsruhe – 30 July 1994 in Cologne) was a German opera director, set designer and opera singer (bass).

Neugebauer was the son of the opera singer Helmuth Neugebauer. After graduating from high school, he studied music, singing (bass) and stage design. 

Neugebauer also directed the world premiere of Zimmermann's opera Die Soldaten (Cologne 1965).

References

External links 
 Nachruf FAZ 1994

1916 births
1994 deaths
Musicians from Karlsruhe
German opera directors